Ansongo Airport   is an airport serving  Ansongo in Mali.

Airports in Mali